The 2017 Mid-American Conference baseball tournament was held from May 24 to 28. The top eight regular season finishers of the league's eleven teams, regardless of division, meet in the double-elimination tournament to be held at Sprenger Stadium in Avon, Ohio. Ohio won the tournament and earned the conference's automatic bid to the 2017 NCAA Division I baseball tournament.

Seeding and format
The winners of each division claimed the top two seeds, with the remaining six spots in the field determined by conference winning percentage, regardless of division. Teams then played a two bracket, double-elimination tournament leading to a single elimination final.

Results

References

Tournament
Mid-American Conference baseball tournament
Mid-American Conference baseball tournament
Mid-American Conference Baseball Tournament